Abdellatif Mohamed Ahmed Mohamed (born December 8, 1995) is an Egyptian Greco-Roman wrestler. He competed in the men's Greco-Roman 130 kg event at the 2016 Summer Olympics, in which he was eliminated in the round of 32 by Oleksandr Chernetskyi.

In 2021, he competed in the men's 130 kg event at the 2020 Summer Olympics held in Tokyo, Japan.

He won the gold medal in his event at the 2022 African Wrestling Championships held in El Jadida, Morocco. He won the silver medal in the 130 kg event at the 2022 Mediterranean Games held in Oran, Algeria. He competed in the 130kg event at the 2022 World Wrestling Championships held in Belgrade, Serbia.

References

External links
 

1995 births
Living people
Egyptian male sport wrestlers
Olympic wrestlers of Egypt
Wrestlers at the 2016 Summer Olympics
Competitors at the 2019 African Games
African Games medalists in wrestling
African Games gold medalists for Egypt
African Wrestling Championships medalists
Wrestlers at the 2020 Summer Olympics
Competitors at the 2022 Mediterranean Games
Mediterranean Games silver medalists for Egypt
Mediterranean Games medalists in wrestling
20th-century Egyptian people
21st-century Egyptian people